Gunhilde (or Gunnhild) (died 13 November 1002) is said to have been the sister of Sweyn Forkbeard, King of Denmark, and the daughter of Harald Bluetooth. She was married to Pallig, a Dane who served the King of England, Æthelred the Unready, as ealdorman of Devonshire.

She is supposed to have been a hostage in England when she was killed in the St. Brice's Day massacre, ordered by Æthelred. Pallig is reported alternatively to have been killed in the massacre or to have provoked the massacre by deserting Æthelred's service.

Historians are divided about the strength of the evidence that she was Sweyn Forkbeard's sister. Ryan Lavelle is sceptical of the reliability of the later medieval sources, such as the Chronicle of John of Wallingford, which mention her. However, Frank Stenton described the claim as a "well recorded tradition", and considered that a desire to avenge her death was probably a principal motive for Sweyn's invasion of England in 1003, leading to the eventual conquest of England by his son Cnut.

References

Sources

Danish princesses
1002 deaths
Year of birth unknown
House of Knýtlinga
Daughters of kings